Cecil L. Murray is an American theologian. Formerly the pastor of the First African Methodist Episcopal Church of Los Angeles, he is currently the John R. Tansey Chair of Christian Ethics at University of Southern California.

References

University of Southern California faculty
American theologians
Florida A&M University alumni
Living people
Year of birth missing (living people)